SS Charles F. Amidon was an American Liberty ship built in 1943 for service in World War II.  Her namesake was Charles F. Amidon, an American Judge from 1896 to 1928.

Description 

The engine was built by the Worthington Pump & Machinery Corporation, Harrison, New Jersey.

Construction and career 
This ship was built by Oregon Shipbuilding Corporation in Portland.  She was laid down on 24 September 1943 and launched on 11 October 1943, later completed on 19 October 1943. She was operated by the Grace Lines

She departed Colombo together with Convoy JC 54B on 4 July 1944 for Calcutta while carrying army stores, she arrived six days later. The ship returned to Colombo with Convoy CJ 37 on 2 August. Carlos Carrillo together with Convoy GUS 50 departed from Port Said, on 23 August, for Hampton Roads. She again departed from Hampton Roads for Port Said with Convoy UGS 57 from 12 October until 18 September.  The ship then left with Convoy GUS 57, for Cristóbal, from 15 November until 2 December.

Throughout 1945, Charles F. Amidon made independent trips to Eniwetok, Port Townsend, Hagushi, Kossol Roads, Tacloban, Pearl Harbor, San Francisco, Ulithi, Okinawa, Takuu and Balboa. All rounds actually missed, and Crevalle — which reported her own position as  — suffered no damage or casualties.

In 1946, Charles F. Amidon was transferred to the United States Department of Commerce in Portland, Oregon. In March 1961, she was then sold to Zidell Explorations Inc., Tacoma for opphogging. 

Charles F. Amidon was scrapped in 1961 after being sold to Ankom on 16 March 1961.

References

Citations

Bibliography
 Hinman, Charles R., and Douglas E. Campbell. The Submarine Has No Friends: Friendly Fire Incidents Involving U.S. Submarines During World War II. Syneca Research Group, Inc., 2019. .

 

Liberty ships
Ships built in Portland, Oregon
1943 ships
Maritime incidents in February 1945
Friendly fire incidents of World War II